Vietstar Airlines Multirole Corporation, operated as Vietstar Airlines, is a Vietnamese airline owned as a joint venture agreement with several aviation-related enterprises (including military-related ones), registered in 28 Phan Thuc Duyen Street, Ward 4, Tan Binh District, Ho Chi Minh City, Vietnam with head office in Ho Chi Minh City. The airline was established with a charter capital of VND800 billion ($34.33 million). The carrier started operations in early 2020.

History
The airline was founded on April 27, 2010 and submitted its request to the Vietnamese Prime Minister for approval. The airline's AOC was granted on July 23, 2019. 

Operations started in January, 2020 with a leased Embraer Legacy 600 and Beechcraft King Air B300 linking major cities in Vietnam.

Corporate affairs

Key people
, Phạm Trịnh Phương is the chairman and CEO.

Ownership
Vietstar Airlines is a joint venture between several aviation-related enterprises and is a wholly government-owned corporation, a unit of the Ministry of Defence of Vietnam.

Headquarters
Vietstar Airlines is headquartered in Ho Chi Minh City.

Services
Vietstar Airlines specializes in offering private jet charter for business and leisure. It also provides air ambulance services.
Vietstar Airlines is also provides engineering and ground handling services in many Vietnamese airports.

Fleets

See also
Transport in Vietnam

References 

Airlines of Vietnam
Vietnamese brands
Airlines established in 2010
Vietnamese companies established in 2010